Alvamaja is a monotypic genus of flies, containing only the species Alvamaja chlorometallica. Although originally placed in the family Rhinophoridae, it belongs to the family Polleniidae.

This species is found in Europe (Romania, Serbia).

References

Polleniidae
Oestroidea genera
Monotypic Brachycera genera
Diptera of Europe
Insects described in 2010